Israel Nathan Herstein (March 28, 1923 – February 9, 1988) was a mathematician, appointed as professor at the University of Chicago in 1951. He worked on a variety of areas of algebra, including ring theory, with over 100 research papers and over a dozen books.

Education and career
Herstein was born in Lublin, Poland, in 1923. His family emigrated to Canada in 1926, and he grew up in a harsh and underprivileged environment where, according to him, "you either became a gangster or a college professor." During his school years he played football, ice hockey, golf, tennis, and pool. He also worked as a steeplejack and as a barker at a fair. He received his B.S. degree from the University of Manitoba and his M.A. from the University of Toronto. He received his Ph.D from Indiana University in 1948. His advisor was Max Zorn. He held positions at the University of Kansas, Ohio State University, University of Pennsylvania, and Cornell University before permanently settling at the University of Chicago in 1962. He was a Guggenheim Fellow for the academic year 1960–1961.

He is known for his lucid style of writing, as exemplified by his Topics in Algebra, an undergraduate introduction to abstract algebra that was first published in 1964, with a second edition in 1975. A more advanced text is his Noncommutative Rings in the Carus Mathematical Monographs series. His primary interest was in noncommutative ring theory, but he also wrote papers on finite groups, linear algebra, and mathematical economics.

He had 30 Ph.D. students, traveled and lectured widely, and spoke Italian, Hebrew, Polish, and Portuguese. He died from cancer in Chicago, Illinois, in 1988. His doctoral students include Miriam Cohen, Wallace S. Martindale, Susan Montgomery, Karen Parshall and Claudio Procesi.

Selected publications

Notes

References

External links 
 
 

1923 births
1988 deaths
20th-century American mathematicians
Algebraists
Indiana University alumni
University of Chicago faculty
Ohio State University faculty
Polish emigrants to Canada
Canadian emigrants to the United States
University of Kansas faculty
University of Pennsylvania faculty
Mathematicians at the University of Pennsylvania
Cornell University faculty
University of Manitoba alumni